Couch Potatoes is a 2017 Italian comedy-drama film directed by Francesca Archibugi.

Cast
 Claudio Bisio as Giorgio Selva
 Gaddo Bacchini as Tito Selva
 Ilaria Brusadelli as Alice Bendidio
 Cochi Ponzoni as Pinin Innocenti
 Antonia Truppo as Rosalba Bendidio 
 Matteo Oscar Giuggioli as Lombo
 Gigio Alberti as Gianni
 Barbara Ronchi as Annalisa
 Federica Fracassi as Carla
 Donatella Finocchiaro as President Barenghi
 Sandra Ceccarelli as Livia Innocenti 
 Carla Chiarelli as Elena
 Giancarlo Dettori as the psychoanalyst

References

External links

2017 films
Films directed by Francesca Archibugi
2010s Italian-language films
2017 comedy-drama films
Italian comedy-drama films
2010s Italian films